Bhoja Chak is a small village in Bihiya block of Bhojpur district in Bihar, India. As of 2011, its population was 316, in 57 households. It is located just northeast of the town of Bihiya.

References 

Villages in Bhojpur district, India